Kadha Paranja Kadha is a 2018 Indian Malayalam-language film written and directed by Siju Jawahar, and starring Siddharth Menon, Tharushi, Shaheen Siddique, Renji Panicker, and Dileesh Pothan. The film features music composed by Sithara Krishnakumar and Jaison J. Nair. The film was released on 9 February 2018 in theatres and digital platform in 2021 by Baburaj Asariya through his film production & distribution house Collective Frames. It was released on Amazon Prime in the UK and the USA.

Cast
Santhosh Keezhattoor
Siddharth Menon as Ebby
Renji Panicker
Dileesh Pothan
Praveena
Shaheen Siddique
Tarushi Jha as Jennifer
Pala Aravindan
Yassar as Ashraf
Dr Rajesh Raju George as Psychiatrist

Reception
Vinod Nair of The Times of India gave the film 2.5 out of 5 stars, writing: "The storyline is reasonably good but the audience can’t always relate with the lead characters. Perhaps the lead characters could have been entrusted to more experienced actors."

The film was nominated for the Golden Fox Award at the 22nd season of the Calcutta International Cult Film Festival.

References

External links

2018 films
Indian drama films
2010s Malayalam-language films